Caramell was a Swedish music group, formed by singers Katia Löfgren and Malin Sundström, and producers Jorge "Vasco" Vasconcelo and Juha "Millboy" Myllylä. They are best known for their 2001 single "Caramelldansen." The group released two albums, Gott Och Blandat (1999) and Supergott (2001). Caramell broke up in 2002. Some time after Caramell had their hiatus, Jorge and Juha formed a duo as Vasco & Millboy, but the two split soon after. Sundström also went on to start a solo career as Dinah Nah. The group (as "Caramella Girls") released Supergott Speedy Mixes in 2008.

The group reunited for the Vi som älskar 90-talet concert in Stockholm in 2018.

Discography

Studio albums
Gott Och Blandat (10 September 1999) – No. 23 Sweden
Supergott (16 November 2001) – No. 51 Sweden

Remix albums
Supergott Speedy Mixes (known as U-u-uma-uma SPEED in Japan) (2008) – No. 48 on Oricon

Singles

References

Swedish musical groups
Musical groups established in 1998
Musical groups disestablished in 2002